Rhynchospiza is a genus of American sparrows.  It was formerly included in Aimophila, but recent molecular studies show these two to three species to merit their own genus. All species are distributed in South America.

Species in taxonomic order
 Tumbes sparrow, Rhynchospiza stolzmanni
Yungas sparrow, Rhynchospiza dabbenei
 Chaco sparrow, Rhynchospiza strigiceps

References

 
Bird genera
Taxa named by Robert Ridgway